Home is a live album by American metalcore band August Burns Red released through Solid State Records. in a CD/DVD format. It was filmed live on June 4, 2010, at Warehouse 54 in Manheim, Pennsylvania and was released on September 28, 2010, through Solid State Records.

August Burns Red played different songs from their previous albums. The performance featured many fan favorites from the band's three full-length albums, Constellations, 2007's Messengers and 2005's Thrill Seeker.

The show drew a sold-out crowd of 1250 people who wanted to participate in the performance, including some who traveled internationally, from as close as Montreal to as far as away as Amsterdam. Home also features a bonus video documentary called "Away Games" and featured August Burns Red being interviewed on how they were formed and what they had experienced. It also featured some footage of them touring and fans being interviewed on how August Burns Red had influenced their lives.

Track listing

Personnel
August Burns Red
 Jake Luhrs – lead vocals
 JB Brubaker – lead guitar
 Brent Rambler – rhythm guitar
 Dustin Davidson – bass guitar, backing vocals
 Matt Greiner – drums

Additional personnel
 Doug Spangenberg for Space Monkey Studios, Inc. – direction
 Nick Esposito – production
 Anderson Bradshaw for Space Monkey Studios, Inc. – edit
 Pete Robertson – live audio recording
 Jade Roser – live audio engineering
 Joshua Bowman – lighting direction
 Carson Slovak – mixing
 Troy Glessner – mastering
 Invisible Creature – art direction
 Ryan Clark – illustration, design
 John Awad – live photo

References

External links
Concert Review @ JesusFreakHideout
Album Info @ BandsOnFire

August Burns Red albums
2010 albums
Solid State Records albums